Draga is a village in the municipality of Tutin, in Sandzak-Region of southwestern Serbia. According to the 2002 census, the village had a population of 950 people.

References

Populated places in Raška District